= Krop khem =

Thai snack food

- Place of origin: Thailand
- Main ingredients: Wheat flour

Krop khem (Thai: กรอบเค็ม, pronounced [krɔ̀ːp kʰēm], meaning "salty-crispy") is a Thai snack, like khrongkhraeng but softer. The shape of krop khem is like a thin square sheet; however, it can be changed depending on the maker. But khrongkhraeng has to be stretched and put in a mold to make its shape or a banana steam can be used.

It is made of wheat flour, eggs, water, vegetable oil, sugar, black pepper, salt, coriander roots and garlic.
